Portrait of Giuseppe Verdi is an 1886 pastel portrait of Giuseppe Verdi by Giovanni Boldini, now in the Galleria Nazionale d'Arte Moderna in Rome.

History

In March 1886, Verdi was in Paris to hear on stage Victor Maurel, the baritone approached for the role of Iago in Verdi's opera Otello. Boldini was one of Emanuele Muzio's best friends, who had long dreamed of seeing his master pose for the painter. This was done during a visit by Verdi accompanied by Muzio and Giuseppina Strepponi to the Pigalle workshop during which Boldini made a first portrait after a series of long poses. The oil on canvas, hung on the wall of the living room of the Doria Palace, the Winter residence of the Verdi couple in Genoa, is now kept in the Casa di Riposo per Musicisti in Milan.

Dissatisfied with the result, Boldini remade the portrait of Verdi on 9 April 1886, using the pastel technique, in just five hours. The painter first kept this portrait to present it at the Exposition Universelle of 1889 in Paris, in Brussels in 1897, and at the first Venice Biennale in 1895, to finally give it to the National Gallery of Modern and Contemporary Art in Rome in 1918.

References

Verdi
Verdi
1886 paintings
Paintings in the collection of the Galleria Nazionale d'Arte Moderna
Paintings by Giovanni Boldini
Cultural depictions of Giuseppe Verdi